Il Vento e le Rose is a 2009 Japanese-Italian movie directed by Elisa Bolognini.

Set in Italy, it tells the story of an inhibited young woman from a small Italian town who discovers passion and sexuality when she meets a free-spirited and glamorous Japanese woman.

Cast and characters
Kanō Kyōko as Koko
Maria Cocchiarella Arismendi as Giorgia
Raffaella Panichi as Giorgia's grandmother
Antonio Matessich as gentleman
Alessandro Calabrò as Andrea
Vincent Papa as Bulter
Alessio Sica as Black-haired man  
Paride Moccia as The blonde 
Romano Fortuna as Servant

See also
 List of LGBT-related films directed by women

References

External links
  (in Japanese) (archive)
  The Awakening of Love at Pony Canyon
 
  The Awakening of Love at Japanese Film Database

2009 films
2009 LGBT-related films
2009 romantic drama films
2000s Italian-language films
Japanese romantic drama films
Japanese LGBT-related films
Lesbian-related films
Italian LGBT-related films
2000s Japanese films